Trond Martiniussen (born 5 January 1945) is a Norwegian wrestler. He competed in the men's Greco-Roman 52 kg at the 1972 Summer Olympics.

References

External links

1945 births
Living people
Norwegian male sport wrestlers
Olympic wrestlers of Norway
Wrestlers at the 1972 Summer Olympics
Sportspeople from Fredrikstad